Patricia Anne Keenan (28 September 1968 – 14 January 2011) was an English musician and singer. She was the lead vocalist and founding member of the electronic band Broadcast, which she formed in 1995. The band released a total of five studio albums, including The Noise Made by People (2000), Haha Sound (2003), and Tender Buttons (2005), and earned a cult following.

Keenan died unexpectedly in January 2011 of pneumonia, shortly after she had contracted swine flu while completing a tour of Australia with Broadcast.

Early life 
Patricia Anne Keenan was born in Winson Green, a multicultural inner-city area in west Birmingham, England. She had two brothers, Malcolm and John, and two sisters, Maxine and Barbara. She was raised by her mother Zena, who was a sex worker: "I have got no problem with people knowing me or any personal details about myself," Keenan commented. "I have had a crazy life: I was brought up by a prostitute."

Keenan attended Archbishop Grimshaw Roman Catholic school, presently known as John Henry Newman Catholic school. She worked a range of catering jobs after school until at the age of 21 when she moved to Moseley, a bohemian enclave. She studied Creative Writing at Birmingham University while working on her music career.

Career

Soon after moving to Moseley, Keenan formed a musical duo called Hayward Winters, and subsequently met James Cargill at a 1960s psychedelic revival club. The two of them formed a relationship over their shared interest and formed a folk band, Pan Am Flight Bag. The band was short-lived, only performing two gigs before they reformed in 1996 as Broadcast, which included guitarist Tim Felton, drummer Steve Perkins, and keyboardist Roj Stevens.

With Broadcast, Keenan released a total of five studio albums, including The Noise Made by People (2000), Haha Sound (2003), and Tender Buttons (2005); Keenan wrote the latter while her father was dying of cancer. In 2009 the group released a collaborative album Broadcast and The Focus Group Investigate Witch Cults of the Radio Age, with The Focus Group, the music project of graphic designer Julian House (who also designed all of Broadcast's album sleeves).

Keenan lived in and near Birmingham throughout her life, and her music career was based there. In an interview with Billboard, she said: "There's really a down tone in Birmingham. People here definitely underplay themselves. There's definitely a lack of confidence, and almost a resignation and defeatism among musicians here."

Artistry

Musical style
Keenan possessed an alto vocal range. Music critics noted Keenan's vocals as "childlike" and "alluringly aloof," often "woven within squishy analog synths, pastoral melodies, and mod-style rhythms." In a review published in Spin in 2001, Keenan's vocals and instrumentation alongside bandmate James Cargill were likened to being "stuck in a time warp–the sound of '70s wife-swapping parties with beanbags and unhappy children serving sausages on sticks." Keenan often explored cut-up lyric techniques, inspired partly by her interest in the occult.

Performances
Keenan suffered from stage fright in the beginnings of her career, and earned a reputation for "shoegazing onstage introversion." As the band progressed, however, Keenan's stage fright receded: "I used to get nervous like the whole of that day of the show, and now it only happens the moment I walk onstage," she said in a 1998 interview. "When you listen to me sing my first line, you can always tell my heart is in my throat. Headlining gigs is a confidence booster."

Death 
During a tour in Australia just before Christmas, Keenan contracted the swine flu virus H1N1. It was reported on 14 January 2011 that she had died in the hospital. A statement by Warp Record Label said: "This is an untimely, tragic loss and we will miss Trish dearly - a unique voice, an extraordinary talent and a beautiful human being. Rest in peace."

Within hours of her death, a link was posted on Broadcast's Twitter to a mix of psychedelic, folk, and world music that Keenan had made for a friend prior to leaving for the band's Australian tour. Shortly after, an intimate short film Keenan recorded on Super 8 was released, which showed festival-goers at the 2007 Moseley Folk festival. Tributes to Keenan were made by numerous musicians, including Toro y Moi, Graham Coxon of Blur, and Colin Meloy of The Decemberists.

Discography

Broadcast

 Work and Non Work (1997)
 The Noise Made by People (2000)
 Haha Sound (2003)
 Tender Buttons (2005)
 The Future Crayon (2006)
 Broadcast and The Focus Group Investigate Witch Cults of the Radio Age (2009)
 Berberian Sound Studio (2013)

Guest appearances
 Prefuse 73 – "And I'm Gone" from Surrounded by Silence (2005)
 Prefuse 73 – "The Only Trial of 9000 Suns" from The Only She Chapters (2011) (released posthumously)

References

External links

 

1968 births
2011 deaths
English electronic musicians
Deaths from influenza
English contraltos
English women guitarists
English guitarists
Deaths from pneumonia in England
English women in electronic music
21st-century English women singers
21st-century English singers
Musicians from Birmingham, West Midlands